Sergei Nikitich Kovalev (15 August 1919, Petrograd – 24 February 2011, Saint Petersburg) was a Russian engineer and  architect who designed nuclear submarines for the Soviet Navy while leading the Rubin Design Bureau.

Career 

He was the chief designer for the following submarines: Project 658 (NATO reporting name: Hotel class), 658M (Hotel II), 667A Navaga (Yankee class),  667B (Delta I), 667BD (Delta II), 667BDR (Delta III), 667BRDM (Delta IV), and most famously project 941 Akula (Typhoon class).

92 submarines were built to Kovalyov's designs. The only nuclear submarine designed by Rubin during the Cold War for which Kovalyov wasn't the chief designer was Project 685 Plavnik (NATO Mike class), the bureau's only SSN.

Later life 
Kovalev remained semi-active in naval engineering throughout his life, designing ice-resistant platforms for hydrocarbon exploration on the Arctic shelf in later years.

An accomplished painter in his retirement, he was made an honorary member of the Saint Petersburg Union of Artists.

Awards and memberships 
Kovalev was given numerous awards for his service to the Soviet Union, including:

 Hero of Socialist Labor, twice: 1963, 1974
 Order of Lenin, four times: 1963, 1970, 1974, 1984
 Lenin Prize, 1965
 State Prize of the Soviet Union, 1978
 Order of the October Revolution, 1979
 Medal for Distinguished Labor
 Order for Merit to the Fatherland, twice
 
 Order of Naval Merit
 State Prize of the Russian Federation, 2007

Memberships 

 Academy of Sciences of the Soviet, full member
 Russian Academy of Sciences, full member
 Saint Petersburg Union of Artists, honorary member

References

1919 births
2011 deaths
Engineers from Saint Petersburg
People from Sankt-Peterburgsky Uyezd
Russian inventors
Soviet military engineers
20th-century Russian engineers
Soviet Navy
Full Members of the USSR Academy of Sciences
Full Members of the Russian Academy of Sciences
Heroes of Socialist Labour
Recipients of the Order "For Merit to the Fatherland", 2nd class
Recipients of the Order of Naval Merit (Russia)
Soviet inventors